James Woolley or James Wolley (ca.1695 – 22 November 1786) was a watch and clockmaker from Codnor, Derbyshire.

Life

He was born ca 1695, the son of Samuel Woolley and Abigail Pinegar.

He made turret clocks, one of which was installed in the Nottingham Exchange, which he gifted to the Nottingham Corporation, and in return he was made an honorary burgess of Nottingham. He also made longcase clocks.

He died at his house on Codnor Common on 22 November 1786, a bachelor, and left his fortune to his two nephews.

He signed his clocks "Wolley".  Therefore this article should list his name as James Wolley.

Works

Public clocks include:
Nottingham Exchange 1726, moved to St Nicholas' Church, Nottingham 1830. Now in the Nottingham Industrial Museum.

References

English clockmakers
1690s births
1786 deaths
People from Codnor